Michael Ferris (21 November 1931 – 20 March 2000) was an Irish Labour Party politician who served for more than twenty years as a member of the Oireachtas, as both a Senator and a Teachta Dála (TD). Before becoming a full-time politician, he was secretary to a veterinary practice.

Ferris was a native of Bansha, County Tipperary. There, in the 1950s, he came under the influence of the Very Reverend Canon John Hayes, founder of Muintir na Tíre, and adopted many of his ideas for rural development embracing all sections of the community in an inclusive way. He was elected to the 13th Seanad by the Agricultural Panel in a by-election on 23 April 1975. At the 1977 general election, he was an unsuccessful candidate for Dáil Éireann in the Tipperary South constituency, and was also defeated at the subsequent Seanad elections. He was re-elected in 1981 to the 15th Seanad, and returned again in 1982 and 1983.

At the 1987 general election, Ferris unsuccessfully stood again in Tipperary South, but was afterwards re-elected to the 18th Seanad, again by the Agricultural Panel. In the 1989 election to the European Parliament he was defeated in the Munster constituency, trailing far behind his Labour colleague, Eileen Desmond, who narrowly missed a seat. However, polling for the 1989 general election was held on the same day, and he was finally elected to the Dáil, taking his seat in the 26th Dáil on his third attempt. He was re-elected at the 1992 general election and again at the 1997 general election, taking the last seat in each case. He died suddenly while on parliamentary business in Lisbon on 20 March 2000. The subsequent by-election for his Dáil seat was held on 2 June and won by an independent candidate, Séamus Healy.

Personal life
Ferris championed the rural agricultural economy and was Chairman of the Bansha Agricultural and Industrial Show Society for a number of years. He was married twice, firstly to Josephine Tobin of Bansha, and after her death to Ellen Kiely of Tipperary.

References

1931 births
2000 deaths
Local councillors in South Tipperary
Labour Party (Ireland) TDs
Members of the 13th Seanad
Members of the 15th Seanad
Members of the 16th Seanad
Members of the 17th Seanad
Members of the 18th Seanad
Members of the 26th Dáil
Members of the 27th Dáil
Members of the 28th Dáil
Labour Party (Ireland) senators